Who Killed Bambi? is a 2013 Spanish comedy film directed by Santi Amodeo, which stars Quim Gutiérrez, Julián Villagrán, Enrico Vecchi, Clara Lago, Úrsula Corberó, and Ernesto Alterio. It is a remake of the 2004 Mexican film Matando cabos.

Plot
The fiction takes place in Seville. Two young friends live an unusual adventure: they have to find the way in which the President of the company where they work (and father-in-law of one of the two), returns safe and sound home by strange circumstances. He is found half-naked locked in the trunk of his car. At the same time, a businessman drowning in debt and his partner attempt to carry out an express kidnapping, although, by a series of unfortunate coincidences, they end up sequestering their father by mistake. From there, the problems just begin.

Cast

Production 
The film is a remake of the 2004 Mexican film Matando cabos. It is a Quién Mató a Bambi AIE and Rodar y Rodar ( and Joaquín Padró) production, with the participation of TVE, AXN, and TVC. It boasted a budget of around €2.5 million. Filming began in Seville on 4 February 2013.

Release 
Distributed by Sony Pictures, the film was theatrically released in Spain on 15 November 2013.

See also 
 List of Spanish films of 2013

References

External links 

2013 comedy films
2013 films
2010s Spanish-language films
Spanish comedy films
Rodar y Rodar films
Remakes of Mexican films
Spanish remakes of foreign films
Films shot in the province of Seville
Films set in Seville
2010s Spanish films